Christopher Aspeqvist (born November 9, 1990) is a Swedish professional ice hockey defenceman, currently an unrestricted free agent. He has formerly played with AIK IF in the Swedish Hockey League (SHL).

Playing career 
Aspeqvist was born in Huddinge, although he grew up with Djurgårdens IF. He played several seasons with Djurgården's under-18 team in J18 Elit, as well as with their under-20 team in J20 SuperElit. In the 2008–09 season, senior team Visby/Roma HK of the Swedish Division 1 recalled him on two occasions for play in their team, recording one assist.

He signed his first pro-contract with Huddinge IK of the Division 1 prior to the 2009–10 season to return to his birthplace of Huddinge. His major turning point came in the 2010–11 season, however, with the same team. Scoring 12 goals and 19 points in 38 games, as well as demonstrating good defensive play, he drew attention from AIK of the Swedish Elitserien. He signed a try-out contract with AIK in May 2011, and three months later he extended his contract to the end of the 2011–12 Elitserien season.

References

External links

1990 births
Living people
AIK IF players
Almtuna IS players
Huddinge IK players
Södertälje SK players
Swedish ice hockey defencemen